The 1935 Big Ten Conference football season was the 40th season of college football played by the member schools of the Big Ten Conference (also known as the Western Conference) and was a part of the 1935 college football season.

The 1935 Minnesota Golden Gophers football team, under head coach Bernie Bierman, compiled an undefeated 8–0 record, outscored  opponents, 194 to 36, and has been recognized as the 1935 national champion by seven of the 13 selectors recognized as official by the NCAA. Tackle Ed Widseth was a consensus, first-team All-American.

The 1935 Ohio State Buckeyes football team, under head coach Francis Schmidt, compiled a 7–1 record, tied with Minnesota for the Big Ten championship, led the conference in scoring offense (29.6 points per game), and outscored opponents, 237 to 57. Ohio State's sole loss was to Notre Dame by an 18-13 score. Center Gomer Jones was a consensus, first-team All-American.

Chicago Maroons halfback Jay Berwanger was the first recipient of the Heisman Trophy, received the Chicago Tribune Silver Football as the Big Ten's most valuable player, and was the first player selected in the 1936 NFL Draft.

Season overview

Results and team statistics

Key
UP final = Rankings from UP sports writers. See 1935UP sports writers' poll
PPG = Average of points scored per game
PAG = Average of points allowed per game
MVP = Most valuable player as voted by players on each team as part of the voting process to determine the winner of the Chicago Tribune Silver Football trophy

Regular season

Bowl games
No Big Ten teams participated in any bowl games during the 1935 season.

All-Big Ten players

The following players were picked by the Associated Press (AP), the United Press (UP) and/or the Newspaper Enterprise Association (NEA) as first-team players on the 1935 All-Big Ten Conference football team.

All-Americans

Three Big Ten players were selected as consensus first-team players on the 1935 College Football All-America Team. They were:

Other Big Ten players received first-team honors from at least one selector. They were:

1936 NFL Draft
The following Big Ten players were among the first 100 players selected in the 1936 NFL Draft:

References